Ectoedemia pseudoilicis is a moth of the family Nepticulidae. It is widespread in mainland Greece and also present on Crete and in Turkey.

The wingspan is 3.8-5.9 mm. Adults are on wing from April to July. There is one generation per year.

The larvae feed on Quercus coccifera. They mine the leaves of their host plant. The mine consists of a more or less contorted gallery, almost filled with black frass. In Greece, almost always occurring together with Ectoedemia haraldi.

External links
Fauna Europaea
bladmineerders.nl
Western Palaearctic Ectoedemia (Zimmermannia) Hering and Ectoedemia Busck s. str. (Lepidoptera, Nepticulidae): five new species and new data on distribution, hostplants and recognition

Nepticulidae
Moths of Europe
Moths of Asia
Moths described in 1998